"Little Secrets", written by Michael Angelakos, is the third single by American electropop group Passion Pit, taken from their debut album Manners. The song features background vocals from the PS22 Chorus.

Former Washington Nationals pitcher Dan Haren has used the song as his run-out music. The song is also featured in the video games MLB 11: The Show, MLB 2K13 and Test Drive Unlimited 2.

Music video
Two music videos have been released for the song. The first, directed by Francesco Meneghini, was released in November 2009 and features an abstract remake of the Stargate sequence from 2001: A Space Odyssey. A second video, directed by Timothy Saccenti, premiered in February 2010, and features the band performing to an exuberant crowd of people wearing paper bags painted with faces. As the band performs, the paper bags disintegrate into confetti.

Chart performance

References

2009 singles
Passion Pit songs
2009 songs
Songs written by Michael Angelakos
Columbia Records singles